The name Lowell has been used for six tropical cyclones in the Eastern Pacific Ocean:
 Hurricane Lowell (1984)
 Hurricane Lowell (1990)
 Tropical Storm Lowell (2002)
 Tropical Storm Lowell (2008), made landfall in Baja California and produced major flooding in the Midwest
 Hurricane Lowell (2014)
 Tropical Storm Lowell (2020)

Pacific hurricane set index articles